The 2004 United States Senate election in New York took place on November 2, 2004, along with elections to the United States Senate in other states, as well as the presidential election, elections to the United States House of Representatives, and various state and local elections. Incumbent Democratic Senator Chuck Schumer won re-election to a second term with 71.2% of the vote, at the time the highest margin of victory for any statewide candidate in New York's history, and winning every county in the state except Hamilton. Schumer's vote share would not be surpassed until 2012 when fellow Democrat Kirsten Gillibrand won her first full term with 72% of the vote.

Candidates

Democratic

Declared
Chuck Schumer, incumbent U.S. Senator

Republican

Declared
Howard Mills III, State Assemblyman and former Town Supervisor of Wallkill

Declined
Randy Daniels, New York Secretary of State
Rudy Giuliani, former Mayor of New York City
Peter T. King, U.S. Representative for NY-03
George Pataki, Governor of New York

Conservative

Declared
 Marilyn O'Grady, Long Island ophthalmologist and activist

Green

Declined
David McReynolds, socialist activist and two-time candidate for President with the Socialist Party USA

Libertarian

Declared
 Don Silberger, math professor at State University of New York at New Paltz

Builders

Declared
 Abraham Hirschfeld, real estate developer

Socialist Workers

Declared
 Martin Koppel, writer for The Militant and activist

General election

Campaign
The Conservative Party of New York opposed Republican nominee Assemblyman Howard Mills, due to his support of civil unions and abortion rights.  Instead, they supported ophthalmologist Marilyn O'Grady, a failed candidate for New York's 4th congressional district of the United States House of Representatives in 2002.

Perennial candidate Abraham Hirschfeld, then 84 years old, ran for the office on a minor party line. It was the last campaign of his life, and he would die less than a year later.

Predictions

Results
Source: New York State Board of Elections General Election Results, Certified December 14, 2006

Source:  David Leip's Atlas of U.S. Presidential Elections

Per New York State law, Schumer's totals include minor party line votes: Independence Party (216,198) and Working Families Party (168,719) for Schumer.

Schumer's 71.2% of the vote is the second-highest total in New York election history. He won a majority of the vote in every county in the state, besides Hamilton County.

See also 
 2004 United States Senate elections

References

New York
United States Senate
2004